Sebastián Prieto and Horacio Zeballos were the defending champions, but Zeballos chose to participate  at the U.S. Men's Clay Court Championships instead.
Prieto chose to play with Giovanni Lapentti. They lost to Dominik Meffert and Philipp Oswald in the semifinals.
Franco Ferreiro and Santiago González won in the final 6–3, 5–7, [10–7], against Meffert and Oswald.

Seeds

Draw

Draw

References
 Doubles Draw

Bancolombia Open - Doubles
Bancolombia Open